Takhatgadh is a village 25 kilometers away from taluka headquarters Prantij, and 15 kilometers away from District headquarters Himatnagar in Sabarkantha district, Gujarat, India. Takhatgadh Kampa village current president Shree Nishant Patel. In Takhatgadhkampa village Primary, Secondary and Higher- Secondary schools available for village children also near all village's. Takhatgadhkampa is biggest Kachchi Patel village in Sabarkantha.

The place called Takhatgadh was a dense forest in the year 1924. A person named Premjibhai Punjabhai Patel came to this place from Tharawada village of Kuttch District and purchased thousand hectares of land from Ranasan and Mohanpur States. Premjibhaihad studied up to 2nd standard only but was a visionary and far sighted person. He purchased the land and called hard working, risk taking people from his region to settle there. They cleaned the forest area, found groundwater at 300 to 400 feet and made land cultivable to settle. Not only do they live in the forest but 70% of other animals depend on forests for their homes. Since then the village of Takhatgadh came into existence.

Due to the vision of Premjibhai not only was unproductive forest land made into rich agricultural farmland, but the establishment of Takhatgadh village was done in a planned manner putting into consideration his long term perspective of growth and settlement. Village housing was planned on both sides leaving a broad road in between; land of both the states of Ranasan and Mohanpur was taken to give the settlers enough land for cultivation; all land was vested with individual ownership and no fallow common land is seen. The village was developed in sectors having equal size of roads in all wards, with equal size of plots for all houses in streets of straight lines. All streets are in north-south direction and all houses are in east-west direction considering optimum natural light availability and maximum air flow throughout the day in all seasons. 

Unique of Takhatgadh

1.Samras Village 

Takhatgadh has a tradition to decide their leaders without elections unanimously for any local body; it may be the panchayat or cooperative society. It is a "Samras" village since its establishment long before the State Government launched scheme of samras village. The village community themselves decide a leader for any local organization in an absolutely democratic way. It can be seen that right up to the micro level of wards the leaders are decided in a democratic manner by consensus. Ward leaders then become the second level leaders for the Panchayat and Cooperative bodies. Besides ensuring that a new generation of leadership gets practical experience, the system doesn't allow wastage of money for elections.

2. Peace Loving Village 

The mechanism the villagers have developed for deciding leaders is useful for grievance redressal also. For any type of dispute be it social, political or financial the village has an inbuilt conflict resolution mechanism. Since establishment of Takhatgadh one cannot find any court case filed by villagers against each other. On visiting the village, it was noted that villagers state they do not fight with each other; only fight with situations for the purpose of development only. People of Takhatgadh are peace loving and entrepreneurial proving themselves in different fields.

3. United for Development 

People of Takhatgadh are always ready to grab the opportunity for development. Throughout the world now we can observe the scenario that people are fighting with each other for very small and petty issues and even brothers of one family for small piece of land going to the extent of murdering each other. Takhatgadh people and leaders have set an example like Sardar Vallabh bhai Patel by converting small pieces of land at different locations into big holdings of individual farmers. Voluntarily they have exchanged their small holdings of different locations and directions with each other to convert it into single large holding. Differences of cost of land were paid to either side considering cost of particular piece of land. After having large holdings of land at particular point they made tube wells of ownership to develop irrigated agriculture. The economies of scale have been realized favourably in the village.

4. Zero addiction 

Villagers are not addicted to any substances like liquor, drugs or tobacco. Zero consumption of any type of addictive substance is noted in this village. Sale of Bidi, Tobacco, Cigarette, Wine, Snuff and other substances which are used for addiction is voluntarily restricted in the village. Youth of the village are safe because of this kind of voluntary action and their energy is canalized in positive developments.

5. Health Sector 

The village is far from the district and block headquarters where medical facilities are available. In the 1980s the villagers noted that the road link did not allow for quick medical and emergency treatments at these hospitals of block or district level. To overcome the problem one charitable trust was registered as "Takhatgadh Aarogya Mandal". It was announced to raise fund from and nearby villages and started to collect fund by trust. Record collection was made with participatory approach and 25, 00, 000/- Rupees were collected for the building of hospital. Somehow it was came to knowledge of trust that for such type of assets at village level there is a scheme in which they can get support of Rs. 10, 00, 000/- from government if villagers contribute Rs. 25,00,000/-. Trust applied and received support amount from government. Thus villagers constructed hospital building at the cost of Rs.35,00,000/-. This hospital building has facilities of a Community Health Center (CHC) level, but it was found difficult by trustees to run CHC with recurring expenses of maintenance. The village made an offer to the State Government to run a CHC in this building with the stipulation of better services to people. Villagers invited the concerned minister, secretary and staff of health department in village to study the situation and hand over the building for CHC with two conditions. The first condition is that the CHC must treat all patients equally irrespective of caste and economic status. The second condition is if government do not run it properly with right spirit, then the Trust can take it back. However the Trust still supervises and monitors the overall working of the CHC.

CHC is now working at village level better than block level. Total staff strength is 24 including Superintendent, 3 medical officer, 7 sisters, 4 visiting specialists and supporting staff. Almost 100 OPD patients are visiting CHC daily for consultation and treatments from village and nearby villages of district. Surgeon of CHC is doing average 20 operations per month at local level. Facilities for X-Ray, sonography, laboratory for investigating tests, ambulance services, Operation theater and 35 beds for indoor patients are available at CHC. All services including food for indoor patients are free of cost at CHC with support of the Trust.

The President of the Trust Mr. Devjibhai Arjanbhai Patel and Secretary Mr. Ganpatbhai Veljibhai Patel are active and enthusiastic in working for CHC; during the field visit they informed that land for CHC staff quarters was spared free of cost by villagers. Dr.Jayant Uperiya, General Surgeon expressed his feelings that trustees and people of Takhatgadh are very cooperative and loving, and hence he has spent the last 17 years at this CHC and his children have also become doctors even though we are stationed at such a small and remote village and their schooling was in same village.

6. Agriculture Sector 

Villagers were doing rain fed agriculture in the beginning due to less rainfall. They were facing acute shortage of drinking water in spite of having 100 feet depth well for drinking water. During the year 1957-58 first time tube well was made successfully with the help of Local Board for drinking water and new dimension was opened for irrigated agriculture. Farmers of Takhatgadh started to make tube wells for the purpose of irrigation when they were connected with electricity. Cultivation scenario was changed due to adoption of new hybrid variety of cotton -4. Suitable soil profile of land and hard working of farmers was producing bumper crop of cotton-4 with extra ordinary quality. During seventies cotton of village Takhatgadh was in high demand (Quality & Quantity both) at Bombay and Coimbatore cotton markets named as ‘Takhatgadh Brand’. It made farmers of village Takhatgadh economically strong. 100% land of village Takhatgadh was covered under irrigation by tube wells due to electricity connectivity. They started to cultivate groundnut and maize in addition to hybrid cotton.

Farmers of Takhatgadh faced a downturn in 1980s. Due to problem of white-fly in the year 1982-83 total crop of cotton failed. They stopped growing cotton but during 1986-87 they faced scarcity of water due to drought conditions and cropping pattern was changed automatically for their survival. They started to cultivate spices and oilseeds like; cumin, fennel, and caster. Decreasing level of surface water and ground water lead farmers to adopt drip irrigation and more than 65% farmers have adopted drip irrigation considering conservation of resources and survival. Now farmers have started to grow variety of crops with drip irrigation like; cotton, cumin, fennel, groundnut, potato, tomato, castor, and watermelon.

7. Irrigation Sector 

The innovativeness and challenging nature of farmers of village Takhatgadh keeps them ready for facing any kind of problem. Due to depletion of ground water they formed an irrigation society in the year 2005. Irrigation society has set a unique example of unity and cooperation for getting and distributing water and formed a pattern by doing this. This irrigation society has requested the State Government to spare them water of Narmada River, which government is collecting in Fatehpura pond through Guhai pipeline from Dehgam which is 4 kilometers away from their village. The State Government has sanctioned this subject to the condition in October 2010of compulsory drip system, the cost of pipeline of 4 kilometers, water storage, and water distribution to be borne and managed by the village community.

Irrigation Society has not only agreed to the conditions of government but made their own strategy to overcome everything. They decided to make four pipelines instead of one pipeline of 4 kilometers with 10 inch diameter, at the cost of rupees One Crorewithout any financial support of government or any other organization. They were committed to solve irrigation problem permanently. Society decided to collect contribution of Rupees 3300/- per land holding of one Bigah and have completed the work of laying down pipeline successfully with 100% peoples participation. 10 check dams and 3 ponds are common properties of community, which they have decided to use for storage of water and not to waste for new construction. Now they have to distribute the water up to individual farms for that once again they have decided to get contribution of Rupees One Crore, which is also equal for all without consideration of distance of farms from storage locations. It reflects unity of villagers for any kind of challenge.

8. Cooperative Sector 

Takhatgadh Group Service Cooperative Society ltd. was established in the year 1962. They are giving short term, medium term and long term loans, which amounts Rs.3.27 crore per annum. The Society hasa reserve fund of Rs. one crore. It is therefore a financially sound cooperative society. However just financial soundness does not work, and the Society ensures the quality and innovative use of credit for members. Takhatgadh village has 100 tractors. Farmers were facing difficulty to go 10 to 20 kilometers to get dieselfor their vehicles. Society found solution to this issue by purchasing one tanker of 4000 liters. They started service of sale of diesel without profit (cost to cost) to farmers. Society is purchasing diesel twice in the month and distributing to farmers, which is really unique idea to serve the members. Second welfare service is to issue the cheque of Rupees 5000/- on death of any member.

The Takhatgadh Milk Producing Cooperative Society Ltd. is also progressive. Dr. Chandubhai Patel is Chairman of the society and has been unanimously elected. Government started reservation for women in cooperative societies from 2001 but here in this society woman members are from 1995 in governing body. Society is doing milk sale of Rs.75,00,000/-per year and distributing handsome dividend to members.

9. Panchayat 

Sarpanch says that it was no source village when panchayat was started here in village Takhatgadh, but now it is the most resourceful village and panchayat. Takhatgadh gram panchayat received award for Best Gram Panchayat at District level in the year 1979. Takhatgadh gram panchayat received award for Nirmal Gram panchayat at District level in the year 2010-11. Apart from awards Takhatgadh is having CC roads in all streets, own anganwadi building, pick up stand, drinking water stand, 100% street light, 100% electricity, and 100% houses covered with water tap.

Villagers were facing acute problem of drinking water but in favor of villagers one farmer donated 3 Guntha land at 3 km.distance to panchayat and transferred in the name of gram panchayat for creating drinking water facility. Now due to this favor by one villager the problem of drinking water has been solved and the village is getting drinking water for 24 hours with the help of a 20 HP motor.

Villagers take pride in stating that our panchayat has arranged the collection of solid waste by tricycle on regular basis and given dustbin to each and every household that is why our village is clean. It is also decided where it should be dumped and pits are created for this special purpose. Moreover, panchayat has covered whole village with underground drainage line, which helps villagers keeping village clean.

All records of panchayat are computerized and classified as per government rules. Panchayat is efficiently collecting 100% panchayat tax and now financially sound with the balance of Rs.2,50,000/-.

Villagers and leaders are happy to express their feelings that they are living as one family and not doing anything for getting award but for quality life of their and future generations. They have proved it by giving quality doctors, engineers, scientists in the field of agriculture, teachers for all levels ranging from primary to university level.

References

External links
Government of Gujarat SPIPA research of Takhatgadh Village
Documentary of Takhatgadh Village and people lifestyle. 

Villages in Sabarkantha district